{{Album ratings
| rev1 = AllMusic
| rev1Score = <ref name="allmusic">{{AllMusic |class=album |id=document-5-mw0001131132 |tab= |label=Document #5 |last=Butler |first=Blake |accessdate=February 14, 2015}}</ref>
| rev2 = Sputnikmusic
| rev2Score = 
| rev3 = 
| rev3Score = 
}}Document #5 is the first full length album by hardcore punk band Pg. 99, released in 2000 through Reptilian Records. The album was released on vinyl and CD formats; the vinyl version was released in limited quantities, with 666 copies made. 200 copies were on grey marble vinyl, while the rest were standard black vinyl. Reptilian Records announced that the album would be reissued on LP format in the summer of 2015, however, its release date was pushed back to October 27, 2017, to coincide with the band's reunion tour. The reissue was released on compact disc, vinyl, and digital formats.

Artwork
The artwork to the CD edition was made by Carlos Batts, who's known for working with bands such as Danzig and Mastodon. The cover to the vinyl edition was drawn by Chris Taylor, one of the vocalists of Pg. 99. It features a short comic, showing a young man walking through a wall. The same comic was also used on the inside sleeve to the vinyl version of their discography compilation Document #14: The Singles''.

Track listing

Personnel
Pg.99
Blake Midgette - Vocals
Chris Taylor - Vocals
Mike Taylor - Guitar
George Crum - Guitar
Cory Stevenson - Bass
Jonny Ward - Drums

Production
Carlos Batts - Artwork (CD Version)
Christ Taylor - Artwork (LP Version)
Drew Mazurek - Engineering, Recording
Mike Taylor - Recording
Fil - Photography

References

2000 albums
Pg. 99 albums